Pylon Peak may refer to:

 Pylon Peak (British Columbia), a mountain in British Columbia, Canada
 Pylon Peak (Wyoming), a mountain in the Wind River Range, Wyoming, USA